Alison Sinclair is a professor of Modern Spanish Literature and Intellectual History at the University of Cambridge, Hispanist, and a fellow of Clare College, Cambridge.

Selected publications
 The Deceived Husband (Oxford: UP, 1993)
 Dislocations of Desire: Gender, Identity, and Strategy in "La Regenta" (North Carolina, 1998)
 Unamuno, the Unknown, and the Vicissitudes of the Self (Manchester: UP, 2001)
 Sex and Society in Early Twentieth-Century Spain: Hildegart Rodríguez and the World League for Sexual Reform (2007)

References

External links
 Sinclair's profile at the University of Cambridge

Fellows of Clare College, Cambridge
English literary critics
Women literary critics
Literary critics of Spanish
Living people
British Hispanists
Year of birth missing (living people)